Nathaniel Cole Park Pond is a man-made lake located by West Colesville, New York. Fish species present in the lake include pumpkinseed sunfish, and smallmouth bass.

References

Lakes of New York (state)
Lakes of Broome County, New York